James' sportive lemur (Lepilemur jamesorum), or the Manombo sportive lemur, is a sportive lemur endemic to Madagascar. James' sportive lemur is found in southeastern Madagascar, living in primary and secondary lowland forests.

Originally named L. jamesi, the name was found to be incorrectly formed and was corrected to L. jamesorum in 2009.

References

Sportive lemurs
Endemic fauna of Madagascar
Mammals of Madagascar
Critically endangered fauna of Africa
Mammals described in 2006